Yksityisalue is a 1962 Finnish drama film directed by Maunu Kurkvaara. It was entered into the 13th Berlin International Film Festival.

Cast
 Sointu Angervo as Soili
 Kyllikki Forssell as Margit Koski
 Kaarlo Halttunen as Carlstedt
 Sinikka Hannula as Kaisu
 Jarno Hiilloskorpi as Pentti Vaara
 Esko Mannermaa as Judge Salin
 Kalervo Nissilä as Toivo Koski
 Pehr-Olof Sirén as Mäkelä
 Tauno Söder as Rape Sollman

References

External links

1962 films
1960s Finnish-language films
1962 drama films
Finnish black-and-white films
Films directed by Maunu Kurkvaara
Finnish drama films